Marcus Camillus Charlemagne (born 17 June 1978) is a Saint Lucian-born cricketer who plays for the Turks and Caicos Islands.  Charlemagne is a left-handed batsman who occasionally fields as a wicket-keeper.

Charlemagne played a single Twenty20 match for the Turks and Caicos Islands against Montserrat in the 2008 Stanford 20/20 at the Stanford Cricket Ground.  He was dismissed for a single run in this match by Lionel Baker, with the Turks and Caicos Islands making just 67 runs in their twenty overs.  Montserrat went on to win the match by 9 wickets.

References

External links

1978 births
Living people
Saint Lucian emigrants to the Turks and Caicos Islands
Turks and Caicos Islands cricketers